Bandar Baru kangkar Pulai (بندر بهارو کڠکر ڤولاي) is a township at the border of mukim Senai, district of Kulai, State of Johor Darul Ta'zim and mukim Pulai, city of Iskandar Puteri, district of Johor Bahru, State of Johor Darul Ta'zim, Malaysia. The township is bordered by Pulai Hijauan to the west, Kangkar Pulai and Taman Pulai Mas to the east, and Pulai Indah to the south. The rest area on it perimeter is covered in green. This township is being developed by Keck Seng since 2008, and ready for occupation from 2010 onward.

Development Phasing

Developments in Mukim Pulai
1. Taman Pulai Bestari
2. Taman Pulai Makmur (Amber Hill)

Developments in Mukim Senai
1. Taman Pulai Ria
2. Taman Pulai Tuah (Fortune Hill and Cube on Hill)
3. Taman Pulai Mesra
5. Taman Pulai Ceria (Sapphire Hill)

Institutional

School
1. Sekolah Menengah Kebangsaan Kangkar Pulai
2. Sekolah Kebangsaan Kangkar Pulai 2
3. Sekolah Jenis Kebangsaan Tamil Kangkar Pulai
3. Sekolah Jenis Kebangsaan Cina Woon Hua

Mosque
Surau At-Taqwa in Taman Pulai Bestari
Surau At-Taubah in Taman Pulai Mesra

See also
 Iskandar Puteri
 Pulai Mutiara
 Pulai Indah, Johor
 Pulai Hijauan, Johor
 Kangkar Pulai

References

Iskandar Puteri
Townships in Johor